The Connecticut PGA Championship is a golf tournament that is a championship of the Connecticut section of the PGA of America.  The tournament has been played annually since 1929 mostly in Connecticut, although it's been held four times in Massachusetts. Dennis Coscina, who has competed on the Senior tour and is long-time teaching pro, holds the record for most wins with eight. PGA Tour winners who have also won the Connecticut PGA Championship include Gene Kunes and Joe Turnesa.

Some controversy exists regarding the winner of the 2002 Championship, Suzy Whaley. By winning the Connecticut PGA that year, she became the first woman in 58 years to qualify for a PGA event, the Greater Hartford Open. The controversy had to do with the fact that she was allowed to play the course off tees 699 yards shorter than the men she competed against. This discrepancy has since been addressed by the PGA with what's commonly called the "Whaley Rule".

Winners

References

External links 
PGA of America – Connecticut section
Connecticut PGA Championship

Golf in Connecticut
PGA of America sectional tournaments
Recurring sporting events established in 1929
1929 establishments in Connecticut
Sports competitions in Hartford, Connecticut